SS Horace H. Lurton was a Liberty ship built in the United States during World War II. She was named after Horace H. Lurton, an Associate Justice of the Supreme Court of the United States.

Construction
Horace H. Lurton was laid down on 12 July 1943, under a Maritime Commission (MARCOM) contract, MC hull 1500, by J.A. Jones Construction, Brunswick, Georgia, and launched on 7 October 1943.

History
She was allocated to Cosmopolitan Shipping Company, on 19 October 1943. On 22 October 1946, she was transferred to the French Shipping Mission, on 6 December 1946, she was sold to them for $544,506. She was scrapped in June 1968.

References

Bibliography

 
 
 
 
 

 

Liberty ships
Ships built in Brunswick, Georgia
1943 ships